Several ships of the Royal Norwegian Navy have been named Æger after Ægir, the Jötunn king of the sea in Norse mythology:
 , a  commissioned in 1938.

Royal Norwegian Navy ship names